The 1925 Colorado Agricultural Aggies football team was an American football team that represented Colorado Agricultural College (now known as Colorado State University) in the Rocky Mountain Conference (RMC) during the 1925 college football season.  In its 15th season under head coach Harry W. Hughes, the team compiled a 9–1 record (8–0 against RMC opponents), won the RMC championship, and outscored all opponents by a total of 228 to 79.

Five Colorado Agricultural players received all-conference honors in 1925: quarterback Kenny Hyde, tackle Julius (Hans) Wagner, guard Glen Clark, fullback Fay Rankin, and guard Otto Kayser. In addition, Kenny Hyde received third-team recognition from the Associated Press on the 1925 College Football All-America Team.

Schedule

References

Colorado Agricultural
Colorado State Rams football seasons
Rocky Mountain Athletic Conference football champion seasons
Colorado Agricultural Aggies football